Ranson's Folly is a lost 1915 silent feature western produced by Thomas A. Edison, Inc. Based on the Richard Harding Davis novel and Broadway play, this film is the second version of the story. An earlier short had been made in 1910. A later film appeared in 1926 Ranson's Folly.

Cast
 Marc McDermott - Patrick Cahill
 Mabel Trunnelle - Mary Cahill
 Marjorie Ellison - A Dope Fiend
 Edward Earle - Lieutenant Ranson
 Joseph Bingham - Rev. John Spaulding
 Gladys Leslie - Miss Perry
 Jessie Stevens - Miss Violet Pebble
 James Harris - Sergeant Clancey
 George A. Wright - Major Caswell

References

External links
 
 

1915 films
1915 Western (genre) films
Lost American films
American films based on plays
Films based on American novels
Films based on adaptations
American black-and-white films
Films directed by Richard Ridgely
Lost Western (genre) films
1915 lost films
Silent American Western (genre) films
1910s American films
1910s English-language films